This is a list of paintings and drawings by the 17th-century Spanish artist Diego Velázquez. Velázquez is estimated to have produced between only 110 and 120 known canvases. Among these paintings, however, are many widely known and influential works.

All paintings are in oil on canvas unless noted.

Seville (until 1622)

Madrid (1622–29)

First trip to Italy (1629–30)

Madrid (1631–48)

Second trip to Italy (1649–51)

Madrid (1651–60)

Paintings of debated attribution

Drawings

Notes

Sources
 
 
 

 
 
 
 
 
 
 

 
 
 
 
 

 
Velazquez